Oxford School is a private middle and high school in Rowland Heights, California. It serves grades 6–12.  Scott Adams is the principal.

The school was founded in 1980 and has been at its current location since 1997. The school, located behind a strip mall, consists of multiple portable classrooms and a grass field with a soccer goal, basketball courts, and a badminton or volleyball net.

Student body
As of 2016 it had about 140 international students, with Chinese nationals making up the majority. Most students stay with area families as part of "homestays", as their parents do not reside in the United States. Some homestays are arranged by the students' parents while others are established by Oxford School. The school employs a homestay coordinator.

Athletics
The basketball team plays pickup games at an area park. It is not a part of any athletic league.

References

External links
 Oxford School

High schools in Los Angeles County, California
Schools in Los Angeles County, California
Private middle schools in California
Private high schools in California
1980 establishments in California
Educational institutions established in 1980